Gukbap, hot soup with rice, is a Korean dish made by putting cooked rice into hot soup or boiling rice in soup. It is commonly served in a ttukbaegi. Whereas soup and rice have been traditionally served separately at tables in Korea, Gukbap means food putting rice into a soup. Soup and rice are sometimes served separately in Korean restaurants for several reasons. 

As inns appeared, Gukbap became popular at the end of the Joseon Dynasty. It was a food that the common people eat often. At first, an  inn's owner may have made Gukbap with vegetables that are available. After the market economy was revitalized, Gukbap with beef and pork may have appeared. Later it also got popular among people in the market and in cities.

Etymology 
Gukbap is a compound of guk (soup) and bap (cooked rice).

Varieties 
 Dwaeji-gukbap – pork and rice soup. It is a Gukbap that brews pig bone in meat broth, and people eat it together with boiled pork slices. The Dwaeji-gukbap's history started during the Korean War. Refugees made a seolleongtang using pig bone which was easy to obtain. That was the beginning of Dwaeji-gukbap.
 Sogogi-gukbap – beef and rice soup.
 Someori-gukbap (소머리국밥) – Someori-gukbap is made putting Ox head in an iron pot, and boiling meat broth for a long time.
 Sundae-gukbap – sundae (Korean sausage) and rice soup.
 Kongnamul-gukbap – kongnamul (soybean sprouts) and rice soup. Kongnamul-gukbap is a food that adds kongnamul, garlic, and salt in an iron pot. In Jeonju, Kongnamul-gukbap became famous because water is very important in Kongnamul-gukbap, and Jeonju is famous for its clean water.
 Gul-gukbap – oyster and rice soup.
 Siraegi-gukbap – siraegi (dried radish greens) and rice soup.
 Ttaro-gukbap – guk (soup) and bap (cooked rice) served in separate bowls.

Similar dishes 
Similar dishes outside Korea include the Chinese paofan and the Japanese ochazuke.

References 

Korean words and phrases
Korean rice dishes
Korean soups and stews
Korean beef dishes